The Karl Mathie House is located in Mosinee, Wisconsin.

History
Karl Mathie was a clergyman, educator, and the first president of Wausau Sulphate Fiber Co. (later Wausau Paper), which revived Mosinee's economy after Dessert's sawmill closed. Later purchased by musician John Altenburgh.

The house is located along the Wisconsin River. It was listed on the National Register of Historic Places in 1980 and on the State Register of Historic Places in 1989.

References

Houses on the National Register of Historic Places in Wisconsin
National Register of Historic Places in Marathon County, Wisconsin
Houses in Marathon County, Wisconsin
Shingle Style architecture in Wisconsin
Bungalow architecture in Wisconsin
Houses completed in 1912